= Lindberg Park =

- Location within Gauteng Location within South Africa
- Coordinates: 26.253°S 28.032°E
- Country: South Africa
- Province: Gauteng
- Municipality: City of Johannesburg
- Main Place: Johannesburg

Area
  - Total: 0.22 km^{2} (0.085 sq mi)

Population (2011)
  - Total: 1,156
  - Density: 5,300/km^{2} (14,000/sq mi)

Racial makeup (2011)
  - Black African: 63.8%
  - Coloured: 9.4%
  - Indian/Asian: 6.1%
  - White: 20.7%

First languages (2011)
  - English: 29.7%
  - Zulu: 19.2%
  - Afrikaans: 15.8%
  - Xhosa: 8.7%
  - Other: 26.6%
- Time zone: UTC+2 (SAST)

Lindberg Park is a suburb of Johannesburg, South Africa. It is located in Region F of the City of Johannesburg Metropolitan Municipality.

== History ==
Prior to the discovery of gold on the Witwatersrand in 1886, the suburb lay on land on one of the original farms called Turffontein. It became a suburb on 20 May 1955. Originally called Turf Club Extension it was eventually named after Albert Victor Lindberg a CNA bookstore director.
